Selçuk–Efes Airport  is a public airport located at Selçuk town in İzmir Province, Turkey.

The airport is operated by the Turkish Aeronautical Association. The airport also hosts activities such as microlight flights, skydiving and training for flying both private and commercial aircraft.

References

External links
 Selcuk-Efes-Airport-LTFB at wikimapia

Airports in Turkey
Buildings and structures in İzmir Province
Selçuk District
Airports established in 1993
1993 establishments in Turkey